Hugh St Clair Stewart  MBE (14 December 1910 – 31 May 2011) was a British film editor and producer. He filmed Bergen-Belsen concentration camp following its liberation in April 1945.

Film editor

Born in Falmouth, England, Stewart was educated first at Clayesmore School and then at St John's College at Cambridge where was taught and influenced by F.R. Leavis. He entered the film industry in the early 1930s.  He trained as a film editor at Gaumont-British, initially cutting together out-takes from Marry Me (1932) and working as assembly cutter on The Constant Nymph that same year.  His first film as editor was Forbidden Territory (1934).  Among the films he cut were Evergreen (1934), Alfred Hitchcock's original version of The Man Who Knew Too Much (1934), Dark Journey (1937), Action for Slander (1937), South Riding (1938), St. Martin's Lane (1938), and The Spy in Black (1939).

World War II

During World War II, Stewart was commissioned into the Army Film and Photographic Unit (AFPU) in 1940 and in 1942 led No. 2 AFPU during the Allied landings in Tunisia. The following year he edited film footage from the fighting into the documentary Desert Victory. In 1944 he co-directed Tunisian Victory with Frank Capra and John Houston, although much of that film was shot in the United States. Stewart went on to lead No. 5 AFPU, covering the D-Day landings, the Battle for Caen and the Rhine Crossing. 

Stewart insisted on filming Bergen-Belsen concentration camp following its liberation, with its piles of bodies being bulldozed into mass graves, its overcrowded barrack blocks and pitifully emaciated survivors. He was awarded a military MBE and demobilized with the rank of lieutenant-colonel.

Film producer

After World War II, Stewart became a film producer, beginning with Trottie True (1949). He began to produce the films of comedian Norman Wisdom, from Man of the Moment (1955) onwards, and the comedy duo of Morecambe and Wise. Although he went into semi-retirement in the late 1960s, he produced several films for the Children's Film Foundation, including All at Sea (1970), Mr. Horatio Knibbles (1971), and High Rise Donkey (1980).

Personal life

He was married to Frances Curl and they had four children. 

He died on 31 May 2011, at the age of 100.

Selected filmography

References

Listing from the British Cinema History Research Project

External links

Obituary in The Telegraph

1910 births
2011 deaths
People educated at Clayesmore School
British film editors
British film producers
People from Falmouth, Cornwall
English centenarians
Men centenarians
British Army General List officers
British Army personnel of World War II
Members of the Order of the British Empire
Alumni of St John's College, Cambridge